The Seoul Korea Temple is the 37th operating temple of the Church of Jesus Christ of Latter-day Saints (LDS Church).

History
The first member of the church in South Korea was baptized in 1951. At that time Korea was in the midst of a war against Communist armies, with the UN intervening. Latter-day Saint servicemen from the United States were the first to bring the LDS Church's teachings to the area.

The first church's missionaries arrived in South Korea in 1954. Some years later, church apostle Boyd K. Packer was assigned to travel to South Korea and find a place in which to build a temple. After considering several locations, Packer eventually chose the property which the church had purchased almost two decades earlier. In 1981, the announcement was made for a temple in Seoul.

Gordon B. Hinckley, of the church's First Presidency, dedicated the Seoul Korea Temple on December 14, 1985. The temple's walls feature Korean granite with six white spires. A traditional, tiled "hundred-year roof" gives the temple a uniquely Korean appearance. Inside, the temple is decorated with delicate brush paintings, intricate wooden molding, silk wall coverings, gold leaf, dome chandeliers, and white lacquer furniture inlaid with mother of pearl.

After the temple was dedicated, a subway system was built in conjunction with the 1988 Summer Olympics in Seoul. The system included a line that ended right at the base of the hill upon which the temple was built, making the temple even more accessible for church members.

The temple is located near what is today Sinchon Station on the Seoul Subway Line 2. This station is located near four major South Korean universities:  Yonsei University, Hongik University, Ewha Womans University, and Sogang University.

In 2020, like all the church's other temples, the Seoul Korea Temple was closed temporarily during the year in response to the coronavirus pandemic.

Presidents
Notable presidents of the temple include Spencer J. Palmer (1988–90) and Han In Sang (1996–2000). As of November 2019, the temple president is Chiwon Kim.

See also

 Comparison of temples of The Church of Jesus Christ of Latter-day Saints
 List of temples of The Church of Jesus Christ of Latter-day Saints
 List of temples of The Church of Jesus Christ of Latter-day Saints by geographic region
 Temple architecture (Latter-day Saints)
 The Church of Jesus Christ of Latter-day Saints in South Korea

References

External links
Seoul Korea Temple Official site
Seoul Korea Temple at ChurchofJesusChristTemples.org

20th-century Latter Day Saint temples
Religious buildings and structures in Seoul
Religious buildings and structures completed in 1985
Seodaemun District
Temples (LDS Church) in Asia
The Church of Jesus Christ of Latter-day Saints in South Korea
1985 establishments in South Korea